Yvon Michel is a French Canadian boxing promoter. His company called GYM (Groupe Yvon Michel) is based in Montréal. The 2012 shows in Quebec were called "Fast and Furious". Yvon has promoted several world title champions, most current being:  Oscar Rivas, Kim Clavel and  Eleider Alvarez. In October 2021, GYM alongside Three Lions Promotions, co-promoted the first WBC Bridgerweight World title in Montreal where Oscar Rivas became the first WBC inaugural champion of the newly created division.

Roster 
His boxers include:
Adonis Stevenson
Joachim Alcine
Antonin Décarie
Herman Ngoudjo
Custio Clayton
Marie-Eve Dicaire
Eleider Álvarez
Oscar Rivas

References

External links 
Groupe Yvon Michel
Videi interview

Living people
Boxing promoters
Canadian businesspeople
Year of birth missing (living people)